Coluria is a plant genus in the sub family Rosoideae native to Asia, Siberia and Altai.

This herbaceous perennial plant reaches 30 cm in height and 30 cm in width. The flowers are hermaphroditic and are pollinated by insects. It grows on the banks of mountains rivers.

Species
 Coluria elegans Cardot
 Coluria geoides (Pall.) Ledeb.
 Coluria henryi Batalin
 Coluria laxmannii Asch. & Graebn.
 Coluria longifolia Maxim.
 Coluria mongolica 
 Coluria oligocarpa (J.Krause) Bolle
 Coluria omeiensis T.C.Ku
 Coluria potentilloides R.Br.
 Coluria purdomii

See also
 List of Rosaceae genera

References

External links

Colurieae
Rosaceae genera
Taxa named by Robert Brown (botanist, born 1773)